The National Centre for Cell Science is a National Level, Biotechnology, Tissue Engineering and Tissue Banking research center located on the campus of University of Pune in Pune, India. The institute formerly known as National Facility for Animal Tissue and Cell Culture, is one of the premier research centers in India, which works on cell-culture, cell-repository, immunology, chromatin-remodelling.

References

External links

See also
International Biotech Park, Hinjawadi, Pune

Savitribai Phule Pune University
Multidisciplinary research institutes
Biotechnology in India
Research institutes in India
Molecular biology institutes